The Malawi News Agency (MANA) is the national news agency of Malawi. It is overseen by the Ministry of Information. It is administered by the Director of Information and Civic Education. It is the largest news network in Malawi and has offices in all regions and districts in Malawi.

Services
MANA is a resource of information for and on Malawi. MANA is responsible for accrediting foreign journalists in Malawi. It regularly contributes to government publications and does private publications as well.

History
It was established in 1966 to spread information from the Malawi government under the Ministry of Information. Its headquarters are in Lilongwe, Malawi. It also has offices in the regional capital cities (Lilonwe, Mzuzu, Blantyre). It has offices in all the Districts of Malawi. It established its online presence in August 2012.

References

External links
 MANA Online

News agencies based in Malawi
Organizations established in 1966
1966 establishments in Malawi